Mikko Turunen (born February 4, 1982) is a professional ice hockey forward who has played with HIFK in the SM-liiga.

See also
Ice hockey in Finland

References

External links

Living people
HIFK (ice hockey) players
HC Slovan Bratislava players
1982 births
Finnish ice hockey defencemen
Finnish expatriate ice hockey players in Slovakia
Espoo Blues players
Kiekko-Vantaa players